Vrbová nad Váhom (Hungarian pronunciation:) is a village and municipality in the Komárno District in the Nitra Region of south-west Slovakia. It lies on the Váh River.

Geography 
It has a population of about 565 people.

History 
In the 9th century, the territory of Vrbová nad Váhom became part of the Kingdom of Hungary. After the Austro-Hungarian army disintegrated in November 1918, Czechoslovak troops occupied the area, later acknowledged internationally by the Treaty of Trianon. Between 1938 and 1945 territory of Vrbová nad Váhom once more  became part of Miklós Horthy's Hungary through the First Vienna Award. From 1945 until the Velvet Divorce, it was part of Czechoslovakia. Since then it has been part of Slovakia. The village was formed in 1968 from parts of Kameničná and Martovce.

Ethnicity 
The village is about 90% Hungarian, 10% Slovak.

Facilities 
The village has a public library, and a  football pitch.

External links 

 

Villages and municipalities in the Komárno District
Hungarian communities in Slovakia